Crème de la crème (French, literally 'cream of the cream') is an idiom meaning "the best of the best", "superlative", or "the very best". It may also refer to:

 Creme de la Creme (band), a defunct German band
 La Crème de la crème, a 2014 French film
 Bake Off: Crème de la Crème,  BBC television show

See also
 Crème de la Crime, part of Severn House Publishers
 BenDeLaCreme, American drag queen
 Creamy layer
 Elite
 Upper class
 Upper crust (disambiguation)
 Best of the Best (disambiguation)